Fort Belle Fontaine (formerly known as Cantonment Belle Fontaine) is a former U.S. military base located in St. Louis County, Missouri, across the Mississippi and Missouri rivers from Alton, Illinois. The fort was the first U.S. military installation west of the Mississippi, in the newly acquired Louisiana Territory, and served as a starting point for many expeditions to the American West.

History

Located on the south bank of the Missouri River, in present-day Missouri, Fort Belle Fontaine was first a Spanish military post. After the Louisiana Purchase, by a treaty made between the United States Government, signed by William H. Harrison and representatives of the Native American Sac and Fox tribes (on November 3, 1804), the fort in 1805 became a fur trading post of the United States Government.  Rudolf Tiller served as factor and Colonel Thomas Hunt served as the military commander.

The trading post was discontinued after 1808, and from 1809 to 1826 the facility served as a United States military fort. During that time period, from about 1809 to 1815, the fort served as the headquarters of the Department of Louisiana, and was the regional Army headquarters during the War of 1812. Its sister forts were Fort Osage along the Missouri near modern Kansas City, which controlled trade with western Indians; and Fort Madison in what is now Iowa, which controlled trade of the Upper Mississippi.

The Old Fort Belle Fontaine Cemetery was established in 1809, when then Lieutenant Colonel Daniel Bissell moved the original Fort Belle Fontaine encampment to a new location. The cemetery was located about 100 yards or so southwest from the Cantonment buildings, which during the period of 1805 to 1826 had interments of at least 30-40 military officers, and about 100 enlisted soldiers.  The location was confirmed to be along the bluffs on the south bank of the Missouri River about a hundred yards southeast along the bluff past the old abandoned block house, when W.T. Norton visited the site in 1911. At that time the old cemetery on the bluff was strewn with rocks and mortar, the debris of old tombs. All the tombs were in a more or less ruinous condition. The tombs were built of masonry, about two feet above the ground, and upon them rested the memorial tables. Most of the inscriptions were illegible.  In 1904, newspaper stories, most notabley in The St. Louis Republic, recorded the recovery and moving of 33 burials with headstones to the newly established Jefferson Barracks National Cemetery. Therefore a considerable number of unmarked burials still remain at the now decertified cemetery. The article in The St. Louis Republic included rough photos and drawings of the site.  This old cemetery is not related to the Bellefontaine Cemetery established in 1849 on the road leading to Fort Belle Fontaine, and initially called the Rural Cemetery.

Preservation
Part of the site of the fort is preserved as the Fort Belle Fontaine County Park, a unit of the park system of St. Louis County, Missouri.  An archaeological site associated with the fort was listed on the National Register of Historic Places in 2016.

See also
 National Register of Historic Places listings in St. Louis County, Missouri

References

External links

 
 

1805 establishments in the Louisiana Territory
1826 disestablishments in Missouri
Archaeological sites on the National Register of Historic Places in Missouri
Buildings and structures in St. Louis County, Missouri
Belle Fontaine
Belle Fontaine
Lewis and Clark Expedition
Belle Fontaine
Belle Fontaine
Missouri Territory in the War of 1812
National Register of Historic Places in St. Louis County, Missouri
Native American history of Missouri
Pre-statehood history of Missouri
Protected areas established in 2016
Protected areas of St. Louis County, Missouri
Ruins in the United States
Belle Fontaine